is a Japanese pop singer. She is the eldest member of the Konami-produced J-Pop group BeForU.

Biography

Early life
Komatsu was born in Tokyo, Japan on December 30, 1974.

Career
Komatsu has released four songs as a solo artist, Dance Dance Revolution's "Ever Snow", Eternal on the album BeForU II, Izayoi on BeForU III and on 6Notes she sang "フレンズ" [Furenzu/Friends].

Her solo work was signed with some capitalized Greek letters as: ΨΦΜΑ ΚΦΜΑΤSU.

Discography

6Notes
 フレンズ (as 代真[Yoma])

beatmaniaIIDX 11 IIDX RED Original Soundtrack
 KI・SE・KI (IIDX RED EDIT) (with BeForU)

beatmaniaIIDX 12 HAPPY SKY ORIGINAL SOUNDTRACK
 We are Disっ娘よっつ打ち命 (with 外花りさ, O.L., ANNIE)
 We are Disっ娘よっつ打ち命(original size) (外花りさ, O.L., ANNIE)

BeForU
 チカラ (LIVE BAND style) (with BeForU)
 DIVE (with BeForU)
 BRE∀K DOWN! (LIVE BAND style) (with BeForU)
 Firefly (with BeForU)
 GRADUATION～それぞれの明日～ (unplugged version) (with BeForU)

BeForU II
 KI・SE・KI(album version) (with BeForU)
 Morning Glory (with BeForU)
 Eternal
 BLACK OUT～I want to be・・・!! (album version) (with BeForU)
 PEACE(^^)v (with BeForU)
 DIVE2006 (with BeForU)

BeForU FIRST LIVE at ZeppTokyo 2006
 KI・SE・KI (with BeForU)
 DIVE2006 (with BeForU)
 Firefly (with BeForU)
 ETERNAL
 チ・カ・ラ (with りゆ& のりあ)
 約束 (with BeForU)
 BLACK OUT～I want to be・・・!! (with BeForU)
 BRE∀K DOWN! (with BeForU)
 PEACE(^^)v (with BeForU)
 GRADUATION ～それぞれの明日～  (with BeForU)

(Dance Dance Revolution 5th Mix) Original Soundtrack
 DIVE (with BeForU)

Dance Dance Revolution 6th Mix (DDRMAX) Original Soundtrack
 DIVE ~more deep & deeper style~ (with BeForU)
 Firefly (with BeForU)

Dance Dance Revolution 7th Mix (DDRMAX2) Original Soundtrack
 BRE∀K DOWN ! (with BeForU)
 ever snow

Dance Dance Revolution EXTREME Original Soundtrack
 GRADUATION ～それぞれの明日～ (with BeForU)
 GRADUATION ～それぞれの明日～ (FULL VERSION)
 STAFF ROLL (with BeForU)

Dance Dance Revolution Party Collection Original Soundtrack
 Freedom (with BeForU)

Dance Dance Revolution FESTIVAL and STRIKE ORIGINAL SOUNDTRACK
 KI・SE・KI (DDR edit) (with BeForU)

Dance Dance Revolution SuperNOVA
 Morning Glory (with BeForU)
 PEACE(^^)v (with BeForU)

Get set GO!! ～BeForU astronauts set～
 Get set GO!! (with BeForU)
 Red Rocket Rising English edit. (with BeForU)

GUITARFREAKS 8thMIX and drummania 7thMIX Original Soundtrack
 BRE∀K DOWN! -GF&DM STYLE- (with BeForU)

GUITARFREAKS 9thMIX and drummania 8thMIX Original Soundtrack
 チカラ (with BeForU)

GuitarFreaksV2　＆　DrumManiaV2
 BLACK OUT (with BeForU)

GUITARFREAKS and drummania BEST TRACKS
 BRE∀K DOWN! (Full Version) (with BeForU)

KI・SE・KI
 KI・SE・KI (with BeForU)
 チカラ (Re-arranged version) (with BeForU)
 Firefly (add Vocal&Mix)(with BeForU)
 約束 (with BeForU)

pop'n music 12 いろは AC ♥ CS pop'n music 10
 GRADUATION ～それぞれの明日～ (from Dance Dance Revolution EXTREME) (with BeForU)

Red Rocket Rising
 Red Rocket Rising (with BeForU)

Strike Party!!!
01. Strike Party!!! (With BeForU)
02. BALA≠BALA (with BeForU)

We Love We 'We Love Winning Eleven'
 Step by Step (with BeForU and イジワルケイFC)

夜花火
夜花火 [ Yo Hanabi Night Fireworks] (with BeForU)
ムーンバイク [Muunbaiku Moonbike] (with BeForU)

Filmography
Hounddog 2 – Lewellen's Neighbor

External links
  Yoma's Profile on BeForU's official website

BeForU
Japanese women singers
Video game musicians
Living people
1974 births
Singers from Tokyo